The 2017 FIFA Club World Cup final was the final match of the 2017 FIFA Club World Cup, the 14th edition of the FIFA Club World Cup, a FIFA-organised football tournament contested by the winners of the six continental confederations, as well as the host nation's league champions. The final was played at the Zayed Sports City Stadium in Abu Dhabi, United Arab Emirates on 16 December 2017 and was contested between Spanish club and title holders Real Madrid, representing UEFA as the reigning champions of the UEFA Champions League, and Brazilian club Grêmio, representing CONMEBOL as the reigning champions of the Copa Libertadores.

Real Madrid won the match 1–0 via a goal from Cristiano Ronaldo for their third FIFA Club World Cup title. This was the first time a team had successfully defended the FIFA Club World Cup title, after Real won the previous year. The victory also marked the tenth time a UEFA team had won the Club World Cup.

Teams

Venue
The Zayed Sports City Stadium in Abu Dhabi was announced as the final venue on  11 April 2017. The stadium had previously hosted the final in 2009 and 2010.

Background
The FIFA Club World Cup, held annually in December, is contested between the winners of continental club competitions and the winners of the host nation's league.

Real Madrid qualified for their fourth Club World Cup by winning the 2016–17 UEFA Champions League. The club previously won the 2014 and 2016 editions of the Club World Cup, second only to Barcelona in number of wins. Madrid entered the competition in the semi-finals, facing UAE Pro-League champions Al-Jazira, who had won against Oceania champion Auckland City FC of New Zealand and Asian champions Urawa Red Diamonds of Japan. Real Madrid won the match 2–1, after controversial decisions by the referee and video assistant referee system.

Brazilian club Grêmio qualified for their first Club World Cup by winning the 2017 Copa Libertadores in November. They entered the semi-finals round, facing North American champions Pachuca of Mexico, who had defeated African champions Wydad Casablanca of Morocco in the quarter-finals. Grêmio won the match 1–0 in extra time, on a goal scored by Éverton in the 95th minute.

Road to the final

Match

Summary
Cristiano Ronaldo scored the only goal of the match in the 53rd minute for Real Madrid, a right foot free-kick from 25 yards out slightly to the left that went through a gap in the defensive wall and into the left corner of the net.

Details

Statistics

See also
Real Madrid CF in international football competitions

References

External links
 

Final
2017
Real Madrid CF matches
Grêmio Foot-Ball Porto Alegrense matches
2017–18 in Spanish football
2017 in Brazilian football
Sports competitions in Abu Dhabi
21st century in Abu Dhabi